Soyuz TMA-20M was a 2016 Russian Soyuz spaceflight to the International Space Station (ISS). It transported three members of the Expedition 47 crew to the ISS. TMA-20M was the 129th flight of a Soyuz spacecraft. The crew consisted of a Russian commander and flight engineer, as well as an American flight engineer.

It was the final flight of the Soyuz TMA-M design, being replaced by the Soyuz MS in 2016.

Crew

Backup crew

References

Crewed Soyuz missions
Spacecraft launched in 2016
2016 in Russia
Spacecraft which reentered in 2016
Spacecraft launched by Soyuz-FG rockets
Fully civilian crewed orbital spaceflights